is a Japanese yuri manga written and illustrated by Kujira. A Witch’s Love at the End of the World was serialized in Comic It from 2018 to 2020 and was collected into three bound volumes. It was licensed for an English-language release by Yen Press in 2020.

Plot 
Alice, a magical prodigy, attends a secret school for witches. Her mysterious academy trains young witches with the aim to use their magic against those who used witched only as tools. Alice has lived her life by this goal but soon finds there may be more outside the academy's rule when Mari, a magic-less human, enters the school.

Media

Manga

Reception 
Anime News Network gave the first volume an overall C grade, noting that the conflict that Alice should not fall in love, because it will cause her to lose her magic "feels more like a shortcut to the girls' relationship than an actual plot device." Anime UK News felt similarly, summarising that "A Witch's Love at the End of the World has the right ingredients for a magical yuri love spell, but overall, it's a quick but disappointing read."

References

External links 
 

Kadokawa Shoten manga
Yen Press titles
Yuri (genre) anime and manga